The following article is a summary of the 2009 football season in Kenya, the 46th competitive season in its history.

Promotion and relegation 

Promoted to Premier League
 A.F.C. Leopards
 Sofapaka

Relegated from Premier League
 Mahakama
 Mathare Youth

Premier League 

The 2009 Kenyan Premier League began on 7 February 2009 and ended on 21 November 2009.

Relegation 
The two last teams, Bandari and Agrochemical, were relegated to the Nationwide League for the following season.

Awards 
The end of season awards were held on 9 December 2009.

Nationwide League 

In 2008, the Nationwide League was divided into 2 zones of 16 teams each. In 2009, the league was restructured to contain two levels: Division One and Division Two, representing the second and third levels of the Kenyan football league system. Division One had 16 teams and Division Two had 2 zones.

Teams 

The following 16 teams participated Division One.

Promotion 
The top two teams, Mahakama and Posta Rangers, were promoted to the Premier League for the following season.

FKL Cup 

The KFF Cup had its name changed to the FKL Cup, in line with the takeover of Kenyan football by Football Kenya Limited.

Though most Premier League clubs boycotted the cup, A.F.C. Leopards beat Congo JMJ United 4-1 in the final on 20 October at the Nairobi City Stadium.

Super Cup 

The 2009 Kenyan Super Cup match was played on January 24, 2009 between Mathare United, the 2008 Kenyan Premier League winners, and Gor Mahia, who set a record for the most KFF Cup titles ever won by winning their ninth title that same year. Gor Mahia won 3−0 at full-time.

National team 
Head coach Francis Kimanzi was sacked after the 2008 CECAFA Cup in January 2009 due to disputes between him and Kenyan football administrators. Kimanzi was replaced on caretaker basis by Bobby Ogolla, before Antoine Hey was appointed to coach Kenya in the World Cup Qualifiers. The latter resigned in November 2009, shortly before Kenya met Nigeria in their last World Cup qualifier match. Hey was replaced by Twahir Muhiddin.

World Cup qualifiers – CAF Third Round (Group 2) 
Kenya participated in the 2010 World Cup qualifiers third qualifying round, which also doubled as the 2010 African Cup of Nations qualifiers. Kenya finished last in its qualifying group winning only one match and missed both tournaments.

CECAFA Cup

2008 CECAFA Cup 

Due to postponement, the 2008 CECAFA Cup continued into 2009. Kenya played their 3 remaining group stage matches, the semi-finals and the final, which they lost to Uganda. Francis Kimanzi was sacked as the head coach shortly after the end of the tournament due to disagreements with the Kenya Football Federation.

Group stage

Semi-finals

Final

2009 CECAFA Cup 
Kenya hosted the 2009 CECAFA Cup, but lost to the eventual tournament winners Uganda 1-0 in the quarter finals.

Group stage

Quarter-finals

Other matches 
The following is a list of all other matches played by Kenya in 2009.

References

External links 
 RSSSF: Kenya 2009
 Kenyan Premier League
 Kenyan Footie - Kenyan Football Portal
 Kenyafootball
 FIFA World Cup 2010 - Africa qualifiers
 FIFA.com - Kenya results and fixtures